Zigurds Lanka (born May 21, 1960 in Baldone) is a Latvian chess player. In  chess, he received the FIDE titles of International Master (IM) in 1987 and Grandmaster (GM) in 1992. In correspondence chess, he earned the title of Correspondence Chess International Master (IM) in 1989.

Lanka started to play chess when he was 6 years old. He won the Latvian Chess Championship in 1993 and 2020. His Elo rating peaks were 2575 in 1997 and 2531 in 2005. Lanka is considered to be an excellent theoretician and trainer. He assisted Alexei Shirov. Zigurds Lanka graduated from the Latvian University and is a journalist by profession.

Lanka is married to former high jumper Nina Serbina.

Championships

Soviet Team Chess Championship
 In 1983, at the third board in the 16th Soviet Team Chess Championship in Moscow (+1, =0, -0).
 In 1979, at the seventh board in the 14th Soviet Team Chess Championship in Moscow (+2, =2, -1);

Chess Olympiads
 In 1992, at the reserve board in the 30th Chess Olympiad in Manila (+5, =4, -1);
 In 1994, at the third board in the 31st Chess Olympiad in Moscow (+2, =9, -1);
 In 2008, at the fourth board in the 37th Chess Olympiad in Dresden (+2, =2, -4).

3rd World Team Chess Championship
 In 1993, at third board in Lucerne (+3, =2, -2).

European Team Chess Championship
 In 1992, at first board in Debrecen (+2, =4, -2);
 In 1997, at second board in Pula (+2, =4, -3);
 In 1999, at first board in Batumi (+3, =3, -3).

Notes

References

 Žuravļevs, N.; Dulbergs, I.; Kuzmičovs, G. (1980), Latvijas šahistu jaunrade, Rīga, Avots., pp. 47 – 50 (in Latvian).

External links
 
 
 
 

1960 births
Living people
Latvian chess players
Latvian journalists
Chess grandmasters
Chess Olympiad competitors
University of Latvia alumni
People from Baldone Municipality